Xerocrassa nicosiana is a species of air-breathing land snail, a pulmonate gastropod mollusk in the family Geomitridae.

Distribution

This species is endemic to Cyprus, where it occurs mainly on the central part of the island.

References

 Gittenberger, E. (1991). On Cyprian Helicellinae (Mollusca: Gastropoda Pulmonata: Helicidae), making a new start. Zoologische Mededelingen, 65 (7): 99-128. Leiden
 Bank, R. A.; Neubert, E. (2017). Checklist of the land and freshwater Gastropoda of Europe. Last update: July 16th, 2017

nicosiana
Endemic fauna of Cyprus
Invertebrates of Cyprus
Molluscs of Asia
Gastropods described in 1991